The 1939 Bowling Green Falcons football team was an American football team that represented Bowling Green State College (later renamed Bowling Green State University) in the Ohio Athletic Conference (OAC) during the 1939 college football season. In their fifth season under head coach Harry Ockerman, the Falcons compiled a 6–1–1 record (3–1–1 against OAC opponents), tied for seventh place out of 19 teams in the OAC, and outscored opponents by a total of 159 to 46. Edward Siminski was the team captain. The team played its home games at University Stadium in Bowling Green, Ohio.

Schedule

References

Bowling Green
Bowling Green Falcons football seasons
Bowling Green Falcons football